The company BassLab produces stringed instruments, mainly basses and guitars, and also some versions of the Chapman Stick and a viola model for Ned Steinberger. Each instrument is crafted of a mixed material, "Tunable Mixed Composite".

The company was founded by the physicist Heiko Hoepfinger in Kassel, Germany. Every instrument is still hand-crafted in Germany. The products are distributed in Australia, Austria, Canada, France, Japan, Sweden, Switzerland, the United Kingdom, and the United States.

History
In 1992, Heiko Hoepfinger started his first experiments to build a bass of a special mixed synthetic resin which he called "Tunable Mixed Composite". In late 1993 the first well-functioning instrument had been built, and the first public appearance of BassLab was at the Frankfurt Musikmesse (Germany) in 2001. Since then, BassLab has been represented at several trade shows and has been introduced in different international magazines. Although BassLab sells instruments all over the world, the instrument are hand-crafted in the point of origin. Today there are four basic bass models and three guitar models. BassLab also builds sticks for Emmett Chapman, violas for Ned Steinberger, and electronics in cooperation with Richter Electronics.

Instruments

The composite used produces instruments with high stability, very low weight, and impassiveness to humidity and temperature changes. The instruments are made in a single piece and are hollow throughout, with no internal bracing. The composite is not poured into a mold and not forced out. Therefore, the manufacturing process allows high ergonomic flexibility. BassLab instruments can be built almost any design asked.

In contrast to traditional carbon/graphite composites, "Tunable Mixed Composite" does not have the reputation of sounding sterile. The composite can be adjusted to the wishes of the clients. Long sustain, fast sound production, and the typical sound of hollowed instruments are just a few of the several specifications offered by BassLab.

Notes

References
Leigh, B. Bass Player Magazine (03/2003) - BassLab STD Review, USA, p. 62
Beecham, W. Australian Guitar (vol. 65/2008) - L-bow review, Australia,  p. 82
Bass Inside Magazine (08/2002)- Review BassLab STD-V, Canada
Walte, C. Bass Musician Magazine (8/01/2007) - Basslab Soul IV and Hevos 800D Bass Head, Canada
Gitarre & Bass – Das Musiker-Fachmagazin, issue 08/2007 (p. 94, p. 144), 05/2008 (p. 178), 03/2007 (p. 160), 02/2004 (p. 104), 07/2004 (p. 114), 03/2003 (p. 138), MM-Musik-Media-Verlag, Ulm, Germany
Remmel, D. Bassolution: Basslab L-Bow im Test

External links
Official site
Official USA site

Musical instrument manufacturing companies of Germany
Guitar manufacturing companies
Electric bass guitars by manufacturer
Bass guitar manufacturing companies
Privately held companies of Germany
Companies based in Kassel